Adyam Kabirovich Kuzyayev (born January 6, 1965) is a Russian-Tajikistani professional football coach and a former player, who last managed Estonia's top tier club Narva Trans from 2015 to 2018. He has formerly managed Russian second league club FC Dynamo St. Petersburg. As a player, he made his debut in the Soviet Second League in 1990 for FC Granit Penza.

His sons Daler Kuzyayev and Ruslan Kuzyayev are professional footballers.

References

1965 births
Living people
Soviet footballers
Tajikistani footballers
Russian footballers
Russian football managers
Vakhsh Qurghonteppa players
FC Dynamo Saint Petersburg managers
Association football defenders
JK Narva Trans managers
FC Orenburg players
Expatriate football managers in Estonia